A functional block diagram, in systems engineering and software engineering, is a block diagram. It describes the functions and interrelationships of a system. 

The functional block diagram can picture:
 Functions of a system pictured by blocks  
 input and output elements of a block pictured with lines 
 the relationships between the functions, and 
 the functional sequences and paths for matter and or signals
The block diagram can use additional schematic symbols to show particular properties. 

Functional block diagrams have been used in a wide range applications, from systems engineering to software engineering, since the late 1950s. They became a necessity in complex systems design to "understand thoroughly from exterior design the operation of the present system and the relationship of each of the parts to the whole." 

Many specific types of functional block diagrams have emerged. For example, the functional flow block diagram is a combination of the functional block diagram and the flowchart. Many software development methodologies are built with specific functional block diagram techniques. An example from the field of industrial computing is the Function Block Diagram (FBD), a graphical language for the development of software applications for programmable logic controllers.

See also
 Function model
 Functional flow block diagram

References 

Diagrams
Systems engineering
Management cybernetics